Rodrigo Abreu de Sá Vilela (born 15 March 1995) is a Portuguese professional footballer who plays as a winger.

Club career
An academy graduate of Louletano, Vilela made his senior debut for the club at the age of 17 in December 2012. 

In June 2018, Vilela joined Académica de Coimbra. He made his LigaPro debut on 19 May 2019 in a game against Varzim.

In September 2020, Vilela signed a contract with Bulgarian club Cherno More Varna. In May 2022, he left the team by mutual consent.

References

External links

1995 births
Living people
Portuguese footballers
Association football midfielders
Liga Portugal 2 players
Segunda Divisão players
First Professional Football League (Bulgaria) players
Louletano D.C. players
Associação Académica de Coimbra – O.A.F. players
S.C.U. Torreense players
PFC Cherno More Varna players
Expatriate footballers in Bulgaria
Footballers from Lisbon